Limping bimetallism was a monetary system in the United States that was partially dependent on silver but primarily dependent on gold. It was developed after the abandonment of bimetallism and the adoption of the gold standard in 1873. The Bland–Allison Act of 1878 allowed the coining of new silver dollars, thus creating this system. Contrary to popular belief, the limping standard was not abandoned upon enactment of the Gold Standard Act of 1900.

References

Numismatics
Economic history of the United States
Metallism